Amesiella minor is the smallest species of the genus Amesiella. These miniature epiphytic orchids are native to the Philippines.

Ecology and habitat 
This species grows on the island of Luzon at heights of 1200 m a.s.l.

Discovery 
It was described by the German botanist Karlheinz Senghas in 1999.

Description 
These miniature, cool-growing, monopodial herbs form small, leathery leaves. Amesiella has white flowers with long spurs. The morphology of the spur suggests moth pollination. The flowers have two gold coloured, vertical stripes on the lateral lobes of the labellum, which is similar to Amesiella philippinensis. The flowers of Amesiella minor are considerably smaller, which is also referred to in the specific epithet "minor", which means "small" in Latin. Up to 5 flowers with short spurs are formed on 7 cm long racemes.

References 

minor
Orchids of the Philippines
Epiphytic orchids
Plants described in 1999